Best is the second live album performed by saxophonist Kenny G, featuring a very similar track listing to The Essential Kenny G. The only difference is Track 15, which is a Mandarin version of "Be My Lady", replacing "Have Yourself a Merry Little Christmas". It was released by Sony BMG in 2006.

Track listing
"Songbird" - 5:03
"Sade" - 4:20
"Slip Of The Tongue" - 4:53
"Don't Make Me Wait For Love" - 4:03
"Silhouette"5:29
"Against Doctor's Orders" - 4:45
"What Does It Take (To Win Your Love)" - 4:08
"Brazil" - 4:38
"Theme from Dying Young" - 4:01
"We've Saved the Best for Last" - 4:20
"Forever in Love" - 5:00
"Midnight Motion (Live)" - 8:23
"By the Time This Night Is Over (Best)" - 4:24
"Loving You" - 3:20
"Be My Lady (Mandarin Version)" - 4:57
"Sentimental" - 6:35

References                 

Kenny G albums
Albums produced by Walter Afanasieff
2006 live albums
Arista Records live albums